Huang Mei-chien (born 13 June 1998) is a Taiwanese swimmer.

In 2014, she competed in the women's 50 metre butterfly at the 2014 Asian Games held in Incheon, South Korea. Four years later, in 2018, she competed in the women's 50 metre butterfly and women's 100 metre butterfly events at the 2018 Asian Games held in Jakarta, Indonesia. She also competed in the mixed 4 × 100 metre medley relay event.

In 2017, she competed in the women's 50 metre freestyle event at the 2017 Summer Universiade held in Taipei, Taiwan.

In 2019, she represented Chinese Taipei at the 2019 World Aquatics Championships held in Gwangju, South Korea. She competed in the women's 50 metre butterfly event. She also competed in the 4 × 100 metre mixed freestyle relay and 4 × 100 metre mixed medley relay events.

She also competed in the women's 50 metre freestyle event at the 2020 Summer Olympics in Tokyo, Japan.

References

External links 
 

Living people
1998 births
Place of birth missing (living people)
Taiwanese female butterfly swimmers
Taiwanese female freestyle swimmers
Asian Games competitors for Chinese Taipei
Swimmers at the 2014 Asian Games
Swimmers at the 2018 Asian Games
Competitors at the 2017 Summer Universiade
Swimmers at the 2020 Summer Olympics
Olympic swimmers of Taiwan
21st-century Taiwanese women